Sir Bennet Hoskyns, 1st Baronet (1609–1680) was an English politician who sat in the House of Commons  variously between 1640 and 1659.

Hoskyns was the son of John Hoskyns of Hereford and his wife Benedicta Moyle, daughter of Robert Moyle of Buckwell, Kent. His father was a poet, lawyer and politician on whose death in 1638 Bennet inherited an estate at Moorhampton, near Hereford.  

In April 1640, he was elected Member of Parliament for Wendover to the Short Parliament.  He was then elected MP for Hereford in the Long Parliament of 1645, but was excluded in Pride's Purge. He was however re-elected for Hereford to the First Protectorate Parliament of 1654, and for Herefordshire to the Second Protectorate Parliament of 1656 and Third Protectorate Parliament of 1659.

At the end of the Civil War Hoskyns acquired (c. 1660) Harewood Park in Herefordshire from the Brown family. and was created a baronet on 18 December 1676.

He died in 1680 at the age of 71. He had married Anne Bingley, daughter of Sir John Bingley of Temple-Combe Somerset. Their son John succeeded to the baronetcy and Harewood Park.

References

1609 births
1680 deaths
English MPs 1640 (April)
English MPs 1640–1648
English MPs 1654–1655
English MPs 1656–1658
English MPs 1659
Baronets in the Baronetage of England